The 2014 FedEx 400 benefiting Autism Speaks was a NASCAR Sprint Cup Series stock car race held on June 1, 2014, at Dover International Speedway in Dover, Delaware. Contested over 400 laps on the  oval, it was the 13th race of the 2014 NASCAR Sprint Cup Series. Jimmie Johnson won the race, his second of the season and ninth at Dover, while Brad Keselowski finished second. Matt Kenseth, Clint Bowyer, and Denny Hamlin rounded out the top five. The top rookies of the race were Kyle Larson (11th), Austin Dillon (20th), and Brett Moffitt (22nd).

Previous week's race
Jimmie Johnson passed Matt Kenseth with nine laps to go to win his first race of the season in the previous week's Coca-Cola 600. "There are more people fretting about things than myself," said Johnson. "I mean what 12 races? Give me a break. Obviously it's great to win and we are very happy to win here especially in the backyard of Hendrick Motorsports, Lowe's headquarters is just up the road as well." Jeff Gordon battled back spasms all weekend and after a two-tire pit stop late was in contention for the win but settled for a seventh-place finish and left Charlotte with the points lead.

Report

Background

The track's turns are banked at twenty-four degrees. The front stretch, the location of the finish line, is banked at nine degrees with the backstretch. The racetrack has seats for 113,000 spectators. Tony Stewart was the defending race winner from the 2013 event.

Entry list
The entry list for the FedEx 400 was released on Tuesday, May 27, 2014 at 9:37 a.m. Eastern time. Forty-three drivers were entered which meant no one failed to qualify.

Practice

First practice

Qualifying

After the session, Keselowski stated that his team "gave me a great car here", as he entered the weekend looking for a second win of 2014.

Qualifying results

Practice (post-qualifying)

Second practice

Final practice

Race

First half

Start

The race began at 1:18 p.m local time. Kyle Larson had to start from the rear of the field due to an engine change. Kyle Busch led his 10,000th lap in Sprint Cup Series competition on lap 29, becoming the 15th driver to reach the milestone. Alex Bowman brushed the wall and brought out the first caution on lap 65. Following the pit stops, Denny Hamlin and David Ragan were both caught speeding on pit road. Kyle Busch led the first 81 laps but was passed by Jimmie Johnson for the lead. Coming off turn four, Clint Bowyer squeezed Busch into the wall on lap 124; Busch hit the wall in turn one and brought out the second caution of the race. He attempted to get back at Bowyer but his crew chief told him it was not Bowyer's fault. Bowyer later regarded the race as a "frustrating day", compromising his own race and Busch's race.

Trouble in turn two
Coming off turn two, A. J. Allmendinger came across Ricky Stenhouse Jr. and got loose. He collected Greg Biffle and both got loose. Biffle went into the wall tail-first, hit Stenhouse, and sent him into the outside wall and head first into the inside one on the backstretch. Landon Cassill and Ryan Truex also spun out in Turn 1. This brought out the third caution of the race. The race was then red-flagged, while Justin Allgaier also took damage when he was clipped in the side by Allmendinger. Kevin Harvick took the lead from Johnson on the restart while on lap 157, Jamie McMurray hit a piece on concrete in Turn 2, hit the wall in Turn 3 and brought out the fourth caution. This happened in a similar fashion to Jeff Gordon at Martinsville Speedway in 2004. NASCAR was forced to red flag the race for a second time to fix a hole in the track, while the concrete also damaged the glass covering the crossover bridge that crosses over the top of Turn 2. The race was suspended for 22 minutes, with Harvick holding the lead at the restart. However, just after the restart, Harvick had a tire go down and Matt Kenseth took the lead.

Second half

Johnson retook the lead on lap 178, and upon completing lap 215, he became the all-time leader in laps led at Dover. Bowman hit the wall for a third time in turn 1 and brought out the fifth caution on lap 222. J. J. Yeley brought out the sixth caution on lap 240 after blowing his engine, while debris brought out the seventh caution with forty laps to go. Casey Mears' right-rear tire came apart and the inner-liner rubber that came off the tire brought out the eighth caution with eight laps to go. Johnson held off a four lap charge by Brad Keselowski to take his second win of the season – successively, for the 13th time in his career – and 68th of his career. "It is incredible," Johnson said. "This race car was awesome. I just have so much to be thankful for. Chad (crew chief Knaus) told me I'd love the car, and sure enough, from the time we unloaded the car, he was right." Keselowski described his day as "up and down" and that his car did not progress as much as he had liked until the halfway mark of the race.

Race results

Race statistics
 Lead changes: 18 among different drivers
 Cautions/Laps: 8 for 41
 Red flags: 2 for 29:01                    
 Time of race: 3 hours, 23 minutes and 52 seconds
 Average speed:

Media

Television

Radio

Standings after the race

Drivers' Championship standings

Manufacturers' Championship standings

Note: Only the first sixteen positions are included for the driver standings.

Note

References

FedEx 400
FedEx 400
FedEx 400
NASCAR races at Dover Motor Speedway